Asher is a town in Pottawatomie County, Oklahoma. The population was 393 at the 2010 census, a decline of 6.2 percent from the figure of 419 in 2000.

Geography
Asher is located at  (34.988580, -96.926550), at the intersection of U.S. Highway 177 and State Highway 39 in Pottawatomie County.

Nearby areas
Nearby cities (with a 15,000+ population) include Ada (21 miles south) and Shawnee (27 miles north). Asher is located two miles (3 km) west of Chisholm Spring, once the site of a trading post operated by Jesse Chisholm, for whom the famous cattle trail was named. A Chisholm family home and cemetery are also located in Asher. The Sacred Heart Mission Site is nine miles east of Asher.

Demographics

As of the 2010 United States Census, there were 393 people, 161 households, and 106 families residing in the town. There were 184 housing units at an average density of 230 per square mile (87.6/km2). The racial makeup of the town was 75.8% white and 13% Native American, with the remainder of another race or mixed race. The population included 10 Hispanic or Latino individuals.

There were 161 households, out of which 32.3% had children under the age of 18 living with them, half (49.7%) were married couples living together, 16.1% had a single householder with no spouse present, and 34.2% were non-families. Individuals living alone accounted for 29.2% of households. Individuals living alone who were 65 years of age or older accounted for 14.3% of households. The average household size was 2.44 and the average family size was 3.01.

In the town, the population was spread out, with 27.7% under the age of 18, 5.9% from 18 to 24, 23.1% from 25 to 44, 24.7% from 45 to 64, and 18.6% who were 65 years of age or older. The median age was 41.6 years. For every 100 females, there were 96.5 males.

The median income for a household in the town was $35,962, and the median income for a family was $44,444. The per capita income for the town was $17,340. An estimated 9.2% of families and 12.2% of the population were below the poverty line, including 2.9% of those under age 18 and 20.8% of those age 65 or over.

History

Beginnings
Asher dates back to 1892 when George "Matt" Asher, from Clay County, Kentucky, purchased land in Oklahoma Territory from a Shawnee estate salesperson to set up his farm home. The post office was established November 26, 1901, when the postmaster of nearby Avoca, Oklahoma, George A. McCurry, moved the Avoca post office and his store to the new community that would become Asher. This was done without permission from the government and left Avoca without a post office. According to the tale, McCurry was given a home and store building as payment for moving the post office to the new settlement. The town was named for Mr. Asher, who supplied the land with the consideration the community would carry his namesake, though he never lived there. There was a sale of public lots in 1902.

Avoca Township

Asher is the last remaining post office in the original Avoca Township, which also included the towns of Sacred Heart Mission, Osmit, Avoca, Meanko, Boyer and Violet.

Growth
 
On October 12, 1900, the Choctaw, Oklahoma and Gulf (CO&G) bought the Shawnee to Tecumseh Railway branch from the Tecumseh Railway Co. and promptly extended the branch to Asher. For the next 40 years, Asher would serve as the termination point for the branch and its engine, "Old Beck". Rapid construction of railroads opened up  of a fertile section of the South Canadian River valley to shipping facilities. Asher was the trade center and market of the area. Further development came when, on January 15, 1903, The Jennings Company closed on 1,000 business and residence lots. The Jennings Company advertised investment in the growing town and new factories and industries of various kinds soon located in Asher.

Asher and the new settlers had hopes of creating a large city. However, the settlers were disappointed when the towns of Seminole and Konawa were built and took away much of Asher's trade. The people of Asher would not give up, and pulled together town resources and constructed a bridge across the Canadian River. The state then used the bridge in its construction of State Highway 18, drawing a small amount of trade to the area from nearby cities, such as Ada. Before the construction of the bridge, those south of Asher could only cross the river when it was shallow enough.

Asher, originally a cotton farming community, suffered in its early years from crop losses caused by boll weevils. Farmers were then dealt a further blow when the town's first two cotton gins were destroyed by fire. These setbacks compounded the loss of trade and left the town in dire straits.

In 1927, oil was discovered in and around the town. Asher sprang up almost overnight to serve the needs of the oil workers. It was also around this time that executives moved into Asher and purchased enormous amounts of supplies and merchandise at inflated prices. There were many businesses in town including feed and grocery stores, jewelry stores and drug stores as well as banks, barber shops, hotels and a small theater. Many leading families of Oklahoma, such as the McAlisters, the O'Dells, the Patterson's, the Campbells and the Byruns, lived in the town. There were also many doctors with offices in Asher. For a while, Asher became prosperous.

County Seat potential
Tecumseh, Oklahoma, was originally the county seat of Pottawatomie County. In late 1930, a long-standing war between Shawnee and Tecumseh escalated when voters approved measures to move the seat to Shawnee. A spin-off of this feud was the move for the creation of a new county, to be named Petroleum County. The new county would be composed of prime oil-producing land, including the southern half of Pottawatomie County and portions of Seminole, Pontotoc and McClain Counties. The move was started by Tecumseh supporters who wanted to make Shawnee's county seat victory as hollow as possible by removing the most valuable section of the county. Asher was slated to be the county seat and it was planned that the greater part of Tecumseh would move down to form an impressive community. There was a paper--The Petroleum County Times—produced, meetings held and petitions circulated. However, the measure never progressed further as times were not favorable for the creation of a new county.

End of the oil boom
The oil boom ended when only four wells proved to be profitable. Once again, Asher was in danger of dying out. Fortunately, another oil well was found just west of the town. This time the people connected to the well were local citizens and were cautious and conservative in their estimates and spending. This led to a small but steady production of oil in the community. Asher was dealt another setback in 1967 when SH-18 was taken out of commission and traffic was diverted west of town on the new US Highway 177. Businesses migrated to the new highway and many storefronts in the original town were closed. The final business, Green's Market, which was located on Division Street (old SH-18) closed in 1985, after serving the community for 40 years. Several businesses on US-177 remain, mostly serving those traveling through the area.

Centennial
In 2001, Asher celebrated its 100th anniversary. The town, along with others in the county that had passed the centennial mark, was honored on a centennial monument dedicated September 21, 2007. This date was chosen to coincide with the Oklahoma Centennial. Other Asher honorees were the First Baptist Church, which was founded in 1902 and Asher School, which was established in 1903. The monument is located in Centennial Park, on the grounds of the Santa Fe Museum, in Shawnee, Oklahoma.

Timeline of major events
Below is a time table of major events that occurred in Asher as well as surrounding communities whose events affected Asher's history.

Post Office
Asher's post office was established on November 26, 1901, when it was moved from nearby Avoca.

Postmasters
Below is a list of Asher Postmasters.

Asher School

Brief history
Asher Public Schools is an independent school district. It has an elementary school (grades Pre-K to 8) and a high school (grades 9 to 12). The school was established in 1903. In 1913, there were four other school districts within three miles (5 km) of Asher—Clover Dale, Gravel Hill, Avoca, and Pleasant Hill. The schools were small, consisting of only a room or two. Basic facilities were at a minimum. Talk began of consolidating all of the schools into the Asher district. This was later accomplished, presumably around the time Asher's new school building was built in 1929.

Original building
Asher Schools' main and original building (after consolidation) was constructed in 1929. The building would later receive two additions, to either end. The center of the facility originally served as the schools' gym, before being converted to an auditorium when a new gym was built in the 1940s. An extensive renovation was completed in late 2006 on the original building. The work was made possible by a $1.295 million bond issue that was approved by residents in February 2005.

Extracurricular activities
Asher School, the Indians, participates in baseball, softball and men and women's basketball. For forty years, from 1959 to 1999, Asher had the winningest high school baseball team in the nation, led by head coach Murl Bowen. In those forty years, Asher won 2,115 games, lost only 349, hauled home forty-five state championship trophies and fourteen state runners-up, and sent dozens of players to college and minor-league baseball. No high school in history, public or private, has won as many games as the Asher Indians. A book was written about a man who once played baseball for the Asher Indians, called The Innocent Man: Murder and Injustice in a Small Town, although the book was not written about him playing ball for the Indians.
The baseball field in Asher was named after Murl Bowen for all the winnings he led Asher to in his coaching years that he was there, and his ever-lasting impression that he left on all Asher citizens. Up to this date, even after slipping into retirement, you can still see Mr. Murl Bowen at the school's basketball games and boys' baseball games.

Asher also has chapters of the Business Professionals of America (BPA), Family, Career, and Community Leaders of America (FCCLA) and the National FFA Organization (FFA). Asher 4-H and FFA regularly captures the top sheep honors at livestock shows.

Media

Television
Asher receives the following television stations off-air.
 KFOR-4 NBC (Oklahoma City)
 KOCO-5 ABC (Oklahoma City)
 KWTV-9 CBS (Oklahoma City)
 KTEN-10 NBC (Sherman-Denison, TX)
 KXII-12 CBS (Sherman-Denison, TX)
 KETA-13 PBS (Oklahoma City)
 KOKH-25 FOX (Oklahoma City)
 KOCB-34 CW (Oklahoma City)
 KAUT-43 MNT (Oklahoma City)
 KSBI-52 IND (Oklahoma City)
 KOPX-TV-62 i (Oklahoma City)

Newspaper
The following newspapers are circulated in Asher.
 The Canadian Sands (Monthly Regional; Wanette, OK)
 The Ada Evening News (Daily; Ada, OK)
 The Shawnee News-Star (Daily; Shawnee, OK)
 The Oklahoman (Daily; Oklahoma City)

Notable people
 Ron Williamson - minor league baseball player, subject of John Grisham's first work of non-fiction, The Innocent Man Williamson died December 4, 2004, due to cirrhosis of the liver.

 Jeff Short - Jeff Short is a former bassist from Asher, Oklahoma he played in the band Lure and was accused of being a Child Molester

Additional photos

References

External links
 Town Website
 Asher Photos on Flickr
 School Website
 Encyclopedia of Oklahoma History and Culture - Asher

Towns in Pottawatomie County, Oklahoma
Towns in Oklahoma
1892 establishments in Oklahoma Territory
Populated places established in 1892